Yishaq Epstein (יצחק אפשטיין), also known as Ishac and Isaac Epstein (Lyuban, Belarus  7 December 1862– Jerusalem 26 February 1943) was a linguist and educator known among the figures in the revival of the Hebrew language as father of the modern Hebrew school in Palestine and for his pioneering "natural method". He was brother of the writer Zalman Epstein.

Hebrew schools in Palestine
Exceptionally as principal of the Hebrew school in Rosh Pinna Epstein attempted to encourage also Arab children from neighbouring Al-Jauna to enroll, though only four did so.

References

1862 births
1943 deaths
Israeli educators
Linguists of Hebrew